Howard V. Miller (1894–1948) was a minister and general superintendent in the Church of the Nazarene. Howard V. Miller was born in Brooktondale, New York, and joined the Church of the Nazarene in 1922. He served as pastor, district superintendent, and college professor until his election to the general superintendency in 1940. Miller was married to Rhea Miller, who wrote the words of the popular hymn "I'd Rather Have Jesus", which was subsequently set to music by George Beverly Shea.

1894 births
1948 deaths
American Nazarene ministers
Miller, Howard V.